Ahuas Airport  is an airport serving the village of Ahuas in Gracias a Dios Department, Honduras. The airport is just south of the village.

See also

Transport in Honduras
List of airports in Honduras

References

External links
 FallingRain - Ahuas
 HERE Maps - Ahuas
 OpenStreetMap - Ahuas
 OurAirports - Ahuas

Airports in Honduras